The New York City Department of Buildings (DOB) is the department of the New York City government that enforces the city's building codes and zoning regulations, issues building permits, licenses, registers and disciplines certain construction trades, responds to structural emergencies and inspects over 1,000,000 new and existing buildings. Its regulations are compiled in title 1 of the New York City Rules.

History

Building and construction regulations have existed in New York City since its early days as New Amsterdam in the 17th century.  A "Superintendent of Buildings" position was created within the Fire Department in 1860, in response to the Elm Street Fire on the Lower East Side of Manhattan, which killed 20 people.  The first Buildings Department was created in Manhattan in 1892.  In 1901 the New York State Legislature passed the Tenement Housing Act of 1901, which established a city Tenement Housing Department, including a Buildings Bureau and a Bureau of Inspection.  A citywide Department of Buildings though did not exist until 1936.

The Department has been restructured numerous times during its existence, and the present Department of Buildings dates from 1972, when the Housing and Development Administration was split into the Department of Buildings and the Department of Housing Preservation and Development.

Former Mayor Robert F. Wagner Jr was Buildings Commissioner prior to becoming Manhattan Borough President.

Organization 

The Department of Buildings is overseen by a Commissioner, appointed by the Mayor, and is responsible for ensuring the agency meets the development and safety objectives determined by each current administration. The appointed commissioner is Eric Ulrich, since May 3, 2022. The Department includes both development and enforcement units, overseen by numerous Deputy Commissioners that report directly to the agency Commissioner. The First Deputy Commissioner, with jurisdiction over all Borough Office operations, is second in command to the Commissioner and is responsible for running the agency in their absence.

There are five City Borough Offices of the Department handling permitting and enforcement for each part of the City, in addition to central enforcement staff. Each office is overseen by a Borough Commissioner and one or more Deputy Borough Commissioners that report directly to the First Deputy Commissioner. The executive offices, and numerous operational and inspection units such as the Department's Emergency Response Team are located at 280 Broadway in Manhattan providing centralized access to all five boroughs.

The Department has a staff of 1,200, including Plan Examiners that review building plans and permit applications, and 426 building inspectors who visit existing buildings and new construction to ensure they are safe and comply with all applicable laws and regulations. The enforcement division also includes a Building Marshal's Office.  The Department issues 140,000 work permits annually, and performs 324,000 inspections each year.

The DOB contracts out building facade inspection work. This involves inspectors who are trained to inspect the facades of buildings over six stories.

Inspectors' uniform
NYC Building Inspectors wear dark blue uniforms and carry badges to identify themselves as building inspectors.

See also
 Self Certification
 New York City Office of Administrative Trials and Hearings (OATH), for hearings conducted on summonses for quality of life violations issued by the Buildings Department

References

External links
 
 Department of Buildings in the Rules of the City of New York
 CityAdmin, a collection of NYC administrative decisions from the Center for New York City Law

Buildings
1977 establishments in New York City
Government agencies established in 1977
New York City Department of Buildings